Gun-Britt Nyberg (born 8 March 1943) is a Swedish orienteering competitor. She received a silver medal in the relay event at the 1968 World Orienteering Championships in Linköping, together with Kerstin Granstedt and Ulla Lindkvist.

References

1943 births
Living people
Swedish orienteers
Female orienteers
Foot orienteers
World Orienteering Championships medalists